Shaim may refer to:
 Shaim, Iran
 Shaim, Russia
 10014 Shaim, an asteroid